Admiral Troubridge may refer to:

Edward Troubridge (c. 1787–1852), British Royal Navy rear admiral
Ernest Troubridge (1862–1926), British Royal Navy admiral
Sir Thomas Troubridge, 1st Baronet (1757–1807), British Royal Navy rear admiral
Thomas Hope Troubridge (1895–1949), British Royal Navy vice admiral

See also
Richard Trowbridge (1920–2003), British Royal Navy rear admiral